Holly oak (Quercus ilex) is a  species of evergreen oak native to the Mediterranean region.

Holly oak(s) may also refer to:

Holly Oak, Delaware, an unincorporated community in New Castle County, Delaware
Hollyoaks, a British soap opera

See also
Holly Oak gorget, a shell artifact believed to be an archaeological forgery
Holyoak, a surname
Holyoke (disambiguation)
Holy Oak, musician